School District Five of Lexington and Richland Counties (abbreviated as District Five or informally as Lex-Rich Five) is a South Carolina school district encompassing a land area of approximately 196 square miles, (508 km2) roughly half of which is situated in each of Lexington and Richland Counties. Student enrollment is at 16,717 as of August 2005. The school district consists of the northern portion of Lexington County lying north of Lake Murray and the Saluda River and the northwestern portion of Richland County lying south of the Broad River. The School District is primarily a residential suburb located to the northwest of the city of Columbia, the capital city of South Carolina. Included in the District Five are the towns of Irmo and Chapin. The school district has three attendance areas: Chapin, Dutch Fork, and Irmo. District Five operates a total of 12 elementary schools, four middle schools, five high schools, and one alternative school. The interim Superintendent is Akil Ross, appointed in June 2021 following the sudden resignation of former superintendent Christina Melton at a board meeting on June 14 over conflicts with some school board members.   The Chief Instructional Officer is Michael Guliano.

High schools 
Irmo High School
Dutch Fork High School
Chapin High School
Spring Hill High School
Academy for Success - alternative school

Elementary and middle schools 
 Ballentine Elementary School
 Chapin Elementary School
 Dutch Fork Elementary School
 H. E. Corley Elementary School
 Harbison West Elementary School
 Irmo Elementary School
 Lake Murray Elementary School
 Leaphart Elementary School
 Nursery Road Elementary School
 Oak Pointe Elementary School
 Piney Woods Elementary School
 River Springs Elementary School
 Seven Oaks Elementary School
 Chapin Middle School
 Crossroads Intermediate School
 Chapin Intermediate School
 Dutch Fork Middle School
 Irmo Middle School

References

External links 

School District Five of Lexington and Richland Counties 2008 archive of website

Education in Columbia, South Carolina
Education in Richland County, South Carolina
Education in Lexington County, South Carolina
School districts in South Carolina